The Viking Altar Rock in Sauk Centre, Minnesota, is a glacial erratic and a local landmark.

The boulder was found in 1943 and is roughly 8.2 m (27 ft) long by 5.2 m (17 ft) wide. It has four roughly triangular holes about 1 meter above the base.
The rock is promoted as an attraction as part of a "Trail of the Vikings" featuring supposed evidence of Norse exploration of Minnesota. This is however conjecture.

The "altar" was rededicated in August 1975 with an ecumenical celebration of Mass.

See also
Skystone, a Western Washington erratic with pits drilled in its upper surface

References

External links
 Historical Sites: Todd County

Archaeological sites in Minnesota
Geography of Stearns County, Minnesota
Glacial erratics of the United States
Minnesota culture
Pseudoarchaeology
Tourist attractions in Stearns County, Minnesota
Rock formations of Minnesota
Landforms of Stearns County, Minnesota